Conspiracy in Mind is the debut album by the Norwegian progressive/power metal band Communic.

Track listing

Reception 
In 2005, Conspiracy in Mind was ranked number 497 in Rock Hard magazine's book of The 500 Greatest Rock & Metal Albums of All Time.

Personnel 
Communic
 Oddleif Stensland – vocals, guitars
 Erik Mortensen – bass
 Tor Atle Andersen – drums

Additional musicians
 Peter Jensen – keyboards

Production
 Recorded, mixed and mastered by Jacob Hansen at Hansen Studios, Denmark

Technical information
Artwork by Mattias Norén of ProgArt Media

References 

2005 albums
Communic albums
Albums produced by Jacob Hansen